El-Sayed Mohamed Abo-Dahab Khedary is an Egyptian Applied Mathematics professor at the Mathematics Department, Faculty of Science, South Valley University, Qena in Egypt. He is a part of the editorial board of Applied and computational Mathematics and also one of the editors of Arabian Journal of Science.

Early life and education 
Elsayed M. Abo-Dahab was born in  Egypt at Sohag- El-maragha-Ezbet to the tribe of  Bani-Helal in 1973. In 1995, he obtained his B. Sc (Ed) in Mathematics from South Valley University and bagged another degree in Pure mathematics from the same Institution in 1997. In 2001, he received his Master's degree in Applied Mathematics and obtained his doctorate degree in 2005 from Assuit University in 2005.

Career 

In 2006, he became a lecturer of mathematics at the faculty of science South Valley University. In 2012, he moved to Taif University, KSA where he became an associate professor. In 2017, he returned to South Valley University where he became a professor of Applied Mathematics.

Memberships 
He is a member of the Egyptian Mathematical Society and Member of the editorial board of Journal of Modern Methods in Numerical Mathematics.

References 

Living people
21st-century Egyptian mathematicians
Egyptian academics
Year of birth missing (living people)